Super Seven Calling Cairo (Italian: Superseven chiama Cairo) is a 1965 Italian Eurospy film directed by Umberto Lenzi and adapted from his own novel of the same name written under the pseudonym "H. Humbert". It stars Roger Browne as the titular secret agent opposite Fabienne Dali, Massimo Serato, and Rosalba Neri. Shot mostly in Egypt, the film is heavily inspired by the early James Bond films starring Sean Connery. It is followed by The Spy Who Loved Flowers in which Browne reprises his role as Martin Stevens, and Lenzi returns to write and direct the film.

Premise
Martin Stevens - a British agent known by his codename "Superseven" - is sent to recover a modified radioactive metal disguised as a camera lens, stolen and sold to an unaware civilian by mistake. The trail leads him to Cairo in pursuit of the camera where he learns that Russian spies are also after the same device in the hopes of putting the western powers at a disadvantage while per business as usual, Stevens comes across several people in the field who are not who they seem to claim.

Cast
Roger Browne as Martin Stevens / Superseven
Fabienne Dali as Denise
Massimo Serato as Alex
Andrea Aureli as Il Levantino (as Andrew Ray)
Dina De Santis as Tania
Rosalba Neri as Faddja
Antonio Gradoli as Yussef (as Anthony Gradwell)
Stella Monclar as Nietta
Mino Doro as Il Professore
Franco Castellani as L'Ispettore Stugel
Claudio Biava as Hans
Emilio Messina as Nickols
Francesco De Leone as Prof. Gabin
Rosalba Neri as Faddja
Paolo Bonacelli as Captain Hume

External links
 

1965 films
1960s spy thriller films
Italian action films
Italian spy thriller films
1960s Italian-language films
Films directed by Umberto Lenzi
1960s action films
1960s Italian films